Cyprus competed at the 2018 Commonwealth Games in the Gold Coast, Australia from 4 to 15 April 2018. It was Cyprus's 10th appearance at the Commonwealth Games.

The Cypriot team consists of 47 athletes competing in eight sports. Only 46 athletes competed.

Medalists

| style="text-align:left; vertical-align:top;"|

Competitors
The following is the list of number of competitors participating at the Games per sport/discipline.

Athletics

Cyprus participated with 17 athletes (10 men and 7 women).

Men
Track & road events

Field events

Women
Track & road events

Field events

Beach volleyball

Cyprus qualified a women's beach volleyball team and received a wildcard for a men's team for a total of four athletes.

Boxing

Cyprus participated with a team of 1 athlete (1 man)

Men

Cycling

Cyprus participated with 2 athletes (1 man and 1 woman).

Road
Men

Mountain bike

Gymnastics

Artistic
Cyprus participated with 6 athletes (4 men and 2 women).

Men
Team Final & Individual Qualification

Individual Finals

Women
Individual Qualification

Rhythmic
Cyprus participated with 3 athletes (3 women).

Team & Individual Qualification

Individual Finals

Shooting

Cyprus participated with 10 athletes (5 men and 5 women).

Men

Women

Swimming

Cyprus participated with 2 athletes (1 man and 1 woman).

Wrestling

Cyprus participated with 1 athlete (1 man).

Men

See also
Cyprus at the 2018 Summer Youth Olympics

References

Nations at the 2018 Commonwealth Games
Cyprus at the Commonwealth Games
2018 in Cypriot sport